Joseph Hugues Boissieu (de) La Martinière, also called Joseph La Martinière (1758, Saint-Marcellin, Isère - 1788, Vanikoro, Solomon Islands) was a French doctor of medicine and botanist and biologist. He disappeared in the Pacific whilst a member of the La Pérouse  expedition.

Life 
Joseph Boissieu (de) La Martinière was from the Boissieu-Perrin family, an old middle-class family of the Dauphiné. His father Jean-Joseph Boissieu was a doctor of medicine attached to the faculty of the University of Montpellier who served a term as consul at Saint-Marcellin. The son Joseph was trained at Montpellier.

As a member of the Lapérouse expedition, Joseph escaped death at the hands of natives in the islands of Samoa in December 1787, by swimming to a boat, without losing the plant specimens he held above water in one hand. In the course of the voyage La Martinière sent correspondence and interim reports back to France, one that traveled overland from Russian Asia in 1787 and another that was conveyed from Australia in 1788; they included newly discovered helminths, crustaceans and the first copepod identified in the Pacific Ocean. In 1788, the two ships of the expedition foundered at Vanikoro in the Solomon Islands and were lost.

His brother Pierre Joseph Didier de Boissieu (fr) (1754 - 1812) was a deputy to the National Convention who did not vote for the King's death.

Namesakes

Places 
Two French streets bear his name::
 rue La Martinière, at Saint-Marcellin (Isère)
 rue Joseph de La Martinière, in the new quartier de la Rouvière Longue at Murviel-lès-Montpellier

Botany 

Two flowering plants in the genus Bossiaea commemorate his name in  Latinised form: 
 Bossiaea heterophylla
 Bossiaea prostrata

Zoology 
A fish parasite in the Capsalidae family carries his name:
Capsala martinierei (Bosc), 1811).

Notes

External links
 Les manants du roi
  David M. Damkaer, The copepodologist's cabinet: a biographical and bibliographical history, 2002.

References 
 Cordier, Henri. (1916). "Deux compagnons de La Pérouse," in Bulletin de la section de géographie, Paris; Cited on livre-rare-book.com en 01/2003.
 Damkaer, David M. (2002). The Copepodologist's Cabinet: a biographical and bibliographical history. Diane Publishing, .

1758 births
1788 deaths
People from Saint-Marcellin, Isère
18th-century French physicians
French biologists
French naturalists
18th-century French botanists